Baumann's olive greenbul (Phyllastrephus baumanni) is a species of songbird in the bulbul family, Pycnonotidae. It is found in West Africa from Guinea and Sierra Leone to south-eastern Nigeria. Its natural habitats are subtropical or tropical moist lowland forests and moist savanna. Although little known, new research has shown it to be plentiful and widespread. Consequently, it is listed as a species of Least Concern by the IUCN. Alternate names for Baumann's olive greenbul include Baumann's bulbul, Baumann's greenbul and olive greenbul.

References 

Baumann's olive greenbul
Birds of West Africa
Baumann's olive greenbul
Taxonomy articles created by Polbot